Steve Schatzberg (February 18, 1943 – August 30, 2008) was an American voice actor, best known as the singing voice of Piglet in the Winnie the Pooh franchise from the 1990s until his death, Tyg Tiger in Shirt Tales, Matt in The Gary Coleman Show and Arvind Lavie in Planetes.

Personal life
Schatzberg and his wife Leslie Daryl Zerg were married in 1981, the couple remained married until Schatzberg's death.

Death
Schatzberg died on August 30, 2008 in Ventura, California, at the age of 65.

Filmography

Anime
 Gurren Lagann - Gable Docker
 Planetes - Arvind Lavie
 Urda - Officer

Non-anime
 Adventures in Voice Acting - Himself
 CBS Storybreak - Various (Ratha's Creature)
 Dink, the Little Dinosaur - Additional Voices
 The Gary Coleman Show - Matt
 The Mork & Mindy/Laverne & Shirley/Fonz Hour - Additional voices
 The Richie Rich/Scooby-Doo Show - Additional voices
 Pole Position - Additional voices
 Pooh's Grand Adventure: The Search for Christopher Robin - Piglet (singing voice)
 Boo to You Too! Winnie the Pooh - Piglet (singing voice)
 Winnie the Pooh: Seasons of Giving - Piglet
 Shirt Tales - Tyg Tiger/Rick Racoon (Episode 4)

Video games
 Disney's Animated Storybook: Winnie the Pooh and the Honey Tree - Piglet
 Goosebumps: Attack of the Mutant - Toadie, Tim, Tina, Tom
 Winnie the Pooh Kindergarten - Piglet
 Winnie the Pooh Preschool - Piglet
 Winnie the Pooh Toddler - Piglet

Theme parks
 The Many Adventures of Winnie the Pooh - Piglet

References

External links

1943 births
2008 deaths
American male video game actors
American male voice actors
Place of birth missing
20th-century American male actors
21st-century American male actors